The 1983 Virginia Slims of Pennsylvania, also known as the Ginny of Central Pennsylvania, was a women's tennis tournament played on indoor carpet courts at the Hershey Racquet Club in Hershey, Pennsylvania in the United States that was part of the Ginny Tournament Circuit of the 1983 Virginia Slims World Championship Series. It was the inaugural edition of the tournament and was held from February 14 through February 20, 1983. Carling Bassett won the singles title.

Finals

Singles

 Carling Bassett defeated  Sandy Collins 2–6, 6–0, 6–4
 It was Bassett's only title of the year and the 1st of her career.

Doubles

 Lea Antonoplis /  Barbara Jordan defeated  Sherry Acker /  Ann Henricksson 6–3, 6–4
 It was Antonoplis' 2nd title of the year and the 2nd of her career. It was Jordan's 2nd title of the year and the 4th of her career.

Notes

References

External links
 International Tennis Federation (ITF) tournament edition details
 Ginny of Central Pennsylvania fact sheet

Virginia Slims of Pennsylvania
Virginia Slims of Pennsylvania